The 1959–60 Yugoslav Second League season was the 14th season of the Second Federal League, the second level association football competition of SFR Yugoslavia, since its establishment in 1946. The league was contested in two regional groups (West Division and East Division), with 12 clubs each.

West Division

Teams
A total of twelve teams contested the league, including nine sides from the 1958–59 season, one club relegated from the 1958–59 Yugoslav First League and two sides promoted from the third tier leagues played in the 1958–59 season. The league was contested in a double round robin format, with each club playing every other club twice, for a total of 22 rounds. Two points were awarded for wins and one point for draws.

Željezničar Sarajevo were relegated from the 1958–59 Yugoslav First League after finishing in the 11th place of the league table. The two clubs promoted to the second level were Igman Ilidža and Varteks.

League table

East Division

Teams
A total of twelve teams contested the league, including nine sides from the 1958–59 season, one club relegated from the 1958–59 Yugoslav First League and two sides promoted from the third tier leagues played in the 1958–59 season. The league was contested in a double round robin format, with each club playing every other club twice, for a total of 22 rounds. Two points were awarded for wins and one point for draws.

Vardar were relegated from the 1958–59 Yugoslav First League after finishing in the 12th place of the league table. The two clubs promoted to the second level were Mačva Šabac and Pobeda.

League table

See also
1959–60 Yugoslav First League
1959–60 Yugoslav Cup

Yugoslav Second League seasons
Yugo
2